The arrondissement of Bar-le-Duc is an arrondissement of France in the Meuse department in the Grand Est region. It has 110 communes.

Composition

The communes of the arrondissement of Bar-le-Duc, and their INSEE codes, are:

 Ancerville (55010)
 Andernay (55011)
 Aulnois-en-Perthois (55015)
 Autrécourt-sur-Aire (55017)
 Bar-le-Duc (55029)
 Baudonvilliers (55031)
 Bazincourt-sur-Saulx (55035)
 Beaulieu-en-Argonne (55038)
 Beausite (55040)
 Behonne (55041)
 Beurey-sur-Saulx (55049)
 Biencourt-sur-Orge (55051)
 Le Bouchon-sur-Saulx (55061)
 Brabant-le-Roi (55069)
 Brauvilliers (55075)
 Brillon-en-Barrois (55079)
 Brizeaux (55081)
 Bure (55087)
 Chanteraine (55358)
 Chardogne (55101)
 Chaumont-sur-Aire (55108)
 Combles-en-Barrois (55120)
 Contrisson (55125)
 Courcelles-sur-Aire (55128)
 Cousances-les-Forges (55132)
 Couvertpuis (55133)
 Couvonges (55134)
 Culey (55138)
 Dammarie-sur-Saulx (55144)
 Érize-la-Brûlée (55175)
 Érize-la-Petite (55177)
 Érize-Saint-Dizier (55178)
 Èvres (55185)
 Fains-Véel (55186)
 Foucaucourt-sur-Thabas (55194)
 Fouchères-aux-Bois (55195)
 Géry (55207)
 Givrauval (55214)
 Guerpont (55221)
 Haironville (55224)
 Les Hauts-de-Chée (55123)
 Hévilliers (55246)
 Ippécourt (55251)
 L'Isle-en-Rigault (55296)
 Juvigny-en-Perthois (55261)
 Laheycourt (55271)
 Laimont (55272)
 Lavincourt (55284)
 Lavoye (55285)
 Ligny-en-Barrois (55291)
 Lisle-en-Barrois (55295)
 Loisey (55298)
 Longeaux (55300)
 Longeville-en-Barrois (55302)
 Louppy-le-Château (55304)
 Mandres-en-Barrois (55315)
 Maulan (55326)
 Menaucourt (55332)
 Ménil-sur-Saulx (55335)
 Mognéville (55340)
 Montiers-sur-Saulx (55348)
 Montplonne (55352)
 Morley (55359)
 Naives-Rosières (55369)
 Naix-aux-Forges (55370)
 Nançois-sur-Ornain (55372)
 Nant-le-Grand (55373)
 Nant-le-Petit (55374)
 Nantois (55376)
 Nettancourt (55378)
 Neuville-sur-Ornain (55382)
 Noyers-Auzécourt (55388)
 Nubécourt (55389)
 Pretz-en-Argonne (55409)
 Raival (55442)
 Rancourt-sur-Ornain (55414)
 Rembercourt-Sommaisne (55423)
 Remennecourt (55424)
 Resson (55426)
 Revigny-sur-Ornain (55427)
 Ribeaucourt (55430)
 Robert-Espagne (55435)
 Rumont (55446)
 Rupt-aux-Nonains (55447)
 Saint-Amand-sur-Ornain (55452)
 Salmagne (55466)
 Saudrupt (55470)
 Savonnières-devant-Bar (55476)
 Savonnières-en-Perthois (55477)
 Seigneulles (55479)
 Seuil-d'Argonne (55517)
 Silmont (55488)
 Sommeilles (55493)
 Sommelonne (55494)
 Stainville (55501)
 Tannois (55504)
 Trémont-sur-Saulx (55514)
 Les Trois-Domaines (55254)
 Tronville-en-Barrois (55519)
 Val-d'Ornain (55366)
 Vassincourt (55531)
 Vaubecourt (55532)
 Vavincourt (55541)
 Velaines (55543)
 Villers-aux-Vents (55560)
 Villers-le-Sec (55562)
 Ville-sur-Saulx (55568)
 Villotte-devant-Louppy (55569)
 Waly (55577)
 Willeroncourt (55581)

History

The arrondissement of Bar-le-Duc was created in 1800.

As a result of the reorganisation of the cantons of France which came into effect in 2015, the borders of the cantons are no longer related to the borders of the arrondissements. The cantons of the arrondissement of Bar-le-Duc were, as of January 2015:

 Ancerville
 Bar-le-Duc-Nord
 Bar-le-Duc-Sud
 Ligny-en-Barrois
 Montiers-sur-Saulx
 Revigny-sur-Ornain
 Seuil-d'Argonne
 Vaubecourt
 Vavincourt

References

Bar-le-Duc